Flemington may refer to:

Places

Australia 
 Homebush West, New South Wales, suburb in Sydney commonly called "Flemington".
 Flemington, New South Wales, a locality within Homebush West
 Sydney Markets, market complex occupying Flemington
 Flemington railway station, Sydney
 Flemington, Victoria, a suburb of Melbourne
 Flemington Racecourse, home of the Melbourne Cup
 Electoral district of Essendon and Flemington
 Electoral district of Flemington

New Zealand 
 Flemington, Canterbury
 Flemington, Hawke's Bay

United Kingdom 
 Flemington, South Lanarkshire, Scotland

United States 
 Flemington, Florida
 Flemington, Georgia
 Flemington, Missouri
 Flemington, New Jersey
 Flemington, Pennsylvania
 Flemington, West Virginia

Music
 Flemington (album), by Danny Federici